NGC 5746 is a barred spiral galaxy located in the eastern part of the constellation of Virgo. It is a member of the NGC 5746 Group of galaxies, itself one of the Virgo III Groups strung out to the east of the Virgo Supercluster of galaxies.

Characteristics 
NGC 5746 is located at a distance of 95 million light years and is seen nearly edge-on, bearing a strong resemblance with the galaxy NGC 4565, that is also seen nearly edge-on.

As with the former, it has a box-shaped bulge that is actually a bar seen from one side and a currently modest star formation activity.

Investigations with the help of the x-ray space telescope Chandra seemed to detect a large cloud of gas surrounding NGC 5746 that was thought to be remnant gas of its formation in the process of being accreted; however, later research has shown that cloud does not actually exist.

Seen in the infrared, NGC 5746 also shows two pseudobulges, one nested within the other – that coincides with its central bar – as well as an inner ring with a radius of 9.1 kiloparsecs and a width of 1.6 kiloparsecs.

References

External links 
 

Barred spiral galaxies
Virgo (constellation)
5746
09499
52665